Torquigener albomaculosus, or the white-spotted pufferfish, is the 20th discovered species of the genus Torquigener. The species was discovered in the ocean waters around the Ryukyu Islands in Japan off the south coast of Amami Ōshima Island. The fish's head and body are colored brown with white spots at the back. Its abdomen is silvery-white with white spots.

Such nest designs were noticed since 1995, but their creation remained a mystery until the species' discovery. The nests are created to attract mates through the nest's impressive design and ability to gather fine sand particles, both of which influence a female's mate choice. Males never reuse a nest. As of 2014, the white-spotted pufferfish is thought to be the only species  that creates these shapes.

In 2015, the International Institute for Species Exploration named it as one of the "Top 10 New Species"  discovered in 2014.

References

Tetraodontidae
Fish described in 2014